Mathieu-Antoine Bouchaud (16 April 1719 – 1 February 1804) was an 18th-century French economist and lawyer who contributed to the Encyclopédie by Diderot and d'Alembert.

Werke (Auswahl) 
1773:  Théorie des traités de commerce entre les nations. Paris.
1784: Recherches historiques sur la police des Romains concernant les grands chemins, les rues et les marchés, Paris, in-8°
1787: Commentaire sur la loi des Douze Tables, dédicated to the King, March. Tome III, p. 103-117; seconde edition in 1803 dedicated to the First Consul, in-4°

Sources 
 Ferdinand Hoefer, Nouvelle Biographie générale, t. 6, Paris, Firmin-Didot, 1857, p. 856.

External links 
 Mathieu-Antoine Bouchaud on Wikisource
  Notices sur les auteurs des dix-sept volumes de « discours » de l'Encyclopédie
 BOUCHAUD Mathieu-Antoine

French economists
18th-century French lawyers
Contributors to the Encyclopédie (1751–1772)
French translators
Italian–French translators
Academic staff of the Collège de France
Members of the Académie des Inscriptions et Belles-Lettres
1719 births
Writers from Paris
1804 deaths
18th-century French translators